Theodore John Pawelek (August 15, 1919 – February 12, 1964) nicknamed "Porky", was an American professional baseball player, who played in four games in Major League Baseball as a catcher and pinch hitter for the  Chicago Cubs. He was born in Chicago Heights, Illinois.

For his brief MLB career, he compiled a .250 batting average in four at-bats. Pawelek had spent 1946 with the Nashville Vols of the Double-A Southern Association, batting .335 with 107 hits and 15 home runs playing his home games in the Vols' hitter-friendly ballpark, Sulphur Dell. In his September trial, he was hitless in his first three appearances for the Cubs, but on September 26, 1946, in what would be his last big-league at bat, he doubled off the Pittsburgh Pirates' Jack Hallett in a 5–3 Chicago victory.

During his 11-season minor league career (1939–1941 and 1946–1953), he played for the Anniston Rams, Hot Springs Bathers, Tulsa Oilers, Nashville Vols, Los Angeles Angels, Portsmouth Cubs, Reidsville Luckies, Lakeland Pilots, Oklahoma City Indians, and Pampa Oilers. His career was interrupted from 1942 to 1945 when Pawelek served with the United States Marines during World War II.

He died in Chicago Heights in an automobile accident at the age of 44. Pawelek was a Detroit Tigers scout at the time of his death.

References

External links

1919 births
1964 deaths
Anniston Rams players
Baseball players from Illinois
Chicago Cubs players
Detroit Tigers scouts
Fulton Tigers players
Hot Springs Bathers players
Lakeland Pilots players
Los Angeles Angels (minor league) players
Major League Baseball catchers
Minor league baseball managers
Nashville Vols players
Oklahoma City Indians players
Pampa Oilers players
People from Chicago Heights, Illinois
Portsmouth Cubs players
Reidsville Luckies players
Road incident deaths in Illinois
Sportspeople from the Chicago metropolitan area
Tulsa Oilers (baseball) players
United States Marines